John Chapman Hodgkinson (December 1883 – 5 June 1915) was an English professional footballer who played as a forward in the Football League for Stockport County and Grimsby Town. He was nicknamed "Cobbler".

Personal life 
Hodgkinson served in the British Army as a territorial. He later re-enlisted as a private in the East Lancashire Regiment during the First World War. Hodgkinson served at Gallipoli and was killed in action during an Ottoman counterattack at the Third Battle of Krithia on 5 June 1915. He was originally reported as missing in action, but his status was changed to presumed dead soon after. Hodgkinson's body was never recovered and he is commemorated on the Helles Memorial.

See also
List of people who disappeared

Career statistics

References

1883 births
1910s missing person cases
1915 deaths
Association football inside forwards
Association football outside forwards
British Army personnel of World War I
British military personnel killed in World War I
East Lancashire Regiment soldiers
English footballers
English Football League players
Footballers from Stockport
Grimsby Town F.C. players
Missing in action of World War I
Missing person cases in Turkey
Nelson F.C. players
Rochdale A.F.C. players
Stockport County F.C. players